

This is a list of the Sites of Special Scientific Interest (SSSIs) in North Yorkshire, England, United Kingdom. In England the body responsible for designating SSSIs is Natural England, which chooses a site because of its fauna, flora, geological or physiographical features. , there are 241 sites designated within this Area of Search. 162 sites have been designated due to their biological interest, 56 due to their geological interest, and 23 for both.

Natural England took over the role of designating and managing SSSIs from English Nature in October 2006 when it was formed from the amalgamation of English Nature, parts of the Countryside Agency and the Rural Development Service. Natural England, like its predecessor, uses the 1974–1996 county system and as such the same approach is followed here, rather than, for example, merging all Yorkshire sites into a single list. Some sites you may expect to find here could therefore be in the Cleveland list.

For other counties, see List of SSSIs by Area of Search. The data in the table is taken from Natural England's website in the form of citation sheets for each SSSI.

Sites

Notes 
Data rounded to one decimal place.
Grid reference is based on the British national grid reference system, also known as OSGB36, and is the system used by the Ordnance Survey.
Link to maps using the Nature on the Map service provided by English Nature.
English Nature citation sheets for each SSSI. Retrieved 8 May 2011.

References 

 
North Yorkshire
Sites of Special Scientific Interest